Several languages are spoken in Sri Lanka within the Indo-Aryan, Austronesian, and Dravidian families. Sri Lanka accords official status to Sinhala and Tamil, and English as a recognised language. The languages spoken on the island nation are deeply influenced by the various languages in India, Europe and Southeast Asia. Arab settlers and the colonial powers of Portugal, the Netherlands and Britain have also influenced the development of modern languages in Sri Lanka. See below for the most-spoken languages of Sri Lanka.

Native and indigenous languages 
As per 2016, the Sinhala language is mostly spoken by the Sinhalese people, who constitute approximately 74.9% of the national population and total about 16.6 million. It uses the Sinhala abugida script, which is derived from the ancient Brahmi script. About 300 of the  Veddah people, totaling barely 2,500 in 2002, speak the Veddah language, of which the origin is debated. The Tamil language is spoken by Sri Lankan Tamils, as well as by Tamil migrants from the neighboring Indian state of Tamil Nadu and by most Sri Lankan Moors. Tamil speakers number around 5 million. There are more than 40,000 speakers of the Sri Lankan Malay language.

Languages of foreign origin 

English in Sri Lanka is fluently spoken by approximately 23.8% of the population, and widely used for official and commercial purposes. It is the native language of approximately 74,000 people, mainly in urban areas. A handful of the 3,400 people of Portuguese descent speak Sri Lankan Portuguese creole.

References

External links 
Ministry of National Languages and Social Integration, Sri Lanka
Department of Official Languages, Sri Lanka
Ethnologue report for Sri Lanka
Sri Lanka Country Studies